James Elliot Goodman (born 19 November 1990) is a former English professional cricketer who played for Kent County Cricket Club between 2007 and 2011. Playing as a top order batsman, Goodman represented England at age-group levels up to the under-19 side before retiring from professional cricket in 2011, aged 20, in order to pursue a career outside the game. Goodman was born in Farnborough in south-east London and attended St Olave's Grammar School in Orpington.

After playing age-group cricket for Kent and becoming a member of the county's cricket academy in 2005, Goodman made his Second XI debut in August 2006. He played for England under-16s in 2007 and toured Sri Lanka and India with England under-19s in 2008, the youngest player in the touring party.

Goodman made his full Kent debut in a limited-overs match against the touring Sri Lanka A side in 2007, going on to make his first-class cricket debut in June 2010 against a touring Pakistani side at Canterbury, scoring a half-century on debut. He was seen as a promising batsman who the county had "high hopes" for, with coach Paul Farbrace describing him as "an outstanding cricketer" after his first-class debut. He played his final match for Kent in June 2011, before turning down the offer of a new contract and retiring from professional cricket at the end of the 2011 season in order to go to university and pursue other career choices.

References

External links

English cricketers
Kent cricketers
Living people
1990 births
People from Farnborough, London
English cricketers of the 21st century